Badbar (also Romanized as Bādbar and Bādbār; also known as Bādvar and Bādvra) is a village in Mazayjan Rural District, in the Central District of Bavanat County, Fars Province, Iran. At the 2006 census, its population was 570, in 154 families.

References 

Populated places in Bavanat County